Breakfast with Amy was an American Christian alternative rock band, formed in 1986 in La Habra, California at the La Habra Four-Square church. At that time, the band consisted of vocalist David Koval, bassist Jeff "Tennessee Beans" Beahn, guitarist Christopher Colbert, and drummer Paul Pellegrin. The pastor of the church was throwing a Saturday night concert. A band had backed out and he needed a replacement. David, Christopher, Paul and Jeff quickly formed "Friends of Amy" to perform.

The band was later joined by Caryn Barker (married the guitarist Christopher Colbert about 1989, divorced about 1996) on guitar and Charlotte Stripland on bass. Charlotte was later permanently replaced in 1989 by Bob "Edwin" Wohler. Brothers Eric and Jeremy Wood filled in on Bass and Drums respectively in the final days of the band.

The band initially released an independent demo tape in 1987. It featured three songs (Funeral, Ferris Wheel and Love Song) and was recorded at Half Moon Studio by engineer Dan Bush. For the demo, the line-up featured Rich Berger on Drums. In 1988 the band released a professionally recorded demo tape (see side B of the Narrowpath release). In 1989, Breakfast with Amy was approached by Greg Sostrom of Narrowpath Records and subsequently signed by him in 1990. This led to the formal release of their studio album Everything Was Beautiful and Nothing Hurt. The album was recorded at Casbah studios in Fullerton, California during two sessions about a year apart. The A side featured new material recorded at the time the band signed with Narrowpath Records of Concord, California. It was produced by Chaz Ramierez, who is known for his work in the Orange County New Wave and Punk scenes. The B side featured their first studio tracks (previously sold at concerts). After limited release through Narrowpath, the band signed with Michael Knott's Blonde Vinyl Records in 1991. With a new label that could better represent the band's progressive music and image, Breakfast with Amy quickly moved to the forefront of the underground Christian rock scene that had been taking shape in Southern California since the early 80's. During the short lifespan of Blonde Vinyl, Breakfast with Amy released 2 studio albums. After the collapse of Blonde Vinyl Records (largely due to a poor distribution network, ill-equipped to handle "new" music in the Gospel market) the band dissolved. In 1995, they released their final album (a live compilation), Live At The Hawleywould Bowl!, under Flying Tart Records. The band never truly found a mainstream audience in or out of Christian circles.

In 1995, Gray Dot records re-released their first album with completely re-mastered tracks and
four bonus demo tracks (culled from their original demo). Today, Breakfast with Amy is remembered by fans of the fledgling alternative Christian rock scene as one
of the staples of Blonde Vinyl Records, being present on nearly all of their compilation CDs (as well as other alternative Christian rock compilations) and being one of only a few artists on the label to make a music video.

For those lucky enough to have seen them live, the band may be best remembered for their outlandish stage shows. A typical performance featured costumes, Go go dancing, flaming taxidermy, and movie projectors used as stage lighting. Shows often ended with instrument destruction and a five-minute wall of feedback. Due to these factors, the band was rarely invited back to a venue be it a club or a church.

Stylistically, the band is best described as Post-punk, mixing elements of Psychedelic rock, Art rock, and Punk rock into an odd amalgam. Some of the songs have decidedly Pop music melodies, while others feature layer after layer of guitar dissonance and feedback. Musical influences include U2, Echo & the Bunnymen, Sonic Youth, The Who, The Ramones, The Sex Pistols and The New York Dolls.

Members
Band members

David Koval — vocals, electric sitar, acoustic guitar, bass, keyboards, mandolin
Jeff "Tennessee Beans" Beahn - bass guitar
Charlotte Stripland - bass guitar
Bob "Edwin" Wohler — bass guitar
Eric Wood - bass guitar
Christopher "Chrissy" Colbert — guitar
Caryn Colbert — guitar
Rich Berger - drums
Paul Pellegrin  — drums
Jeremy Wood - drums

Stage hands

Chris *Mr. Rhumba" Rumbaugh - Team captain and babysitter (band manager)
Nathan Pellegrin - Projectionist
Trish the Dish - Go Go dancer
LaLa Nellie - Go Go dancer
Beth - Go Go dancer
Gina - Go Go dancer
Sonja - Go Go dancer
Margaret the Bubble Girl
Happy fun Clown- Ken Bower (VEEPEE @ BV/VofY)

Discography

Studio albums
 Everything Was Beautiful and Nothing Hurt (1990)
 Dad (1991)
 Love Gift (1992)

Live albums
 Live At The Hawleywould Bowl! (1995)

Compilations
 Blonde Vinyl Teaser II: Food for Thought (1991)
 Radioactive Hits: The Definitive Blonde Vinyl Collection (1993)
 Live Long and Perspire: Sub Tart Vol. 1 (1995)
 Afters (1997)
 Toast and Olive. "Friends of Tomorrow" (1998)

Videos
 Me (music video)
 The Sound of One Hand Snacking [unreleased documentary]

Other
Breakfast with Amy (custom demo)
Everything Was Beautiful and Nothing Hurt (custom demo)
Tuck in Your Love Gift [unreleased album from Vox Vinyl] (1991)
Everything Was Beautiful and Nothing Hurt [reissue] (gray dot #gdr 9503CD) (1995)

See also
Blonde Vinyl Records

References

External links
The Unofficial Breakfast with Amy Webpage
Artist Profile at Blonde Vinyl Tribute Page
Discography Information at drindustrial

Christian rock groups from California
Musical groups from Orange County, California
La Habra, California
Musical groups established in 1986
1986 establishments in California
Musical groups disestablished in 1992
1992 disestablishments in California